Dust and Chimes is an album by experimental indie rock band Six Organs of Admittance. It was initially released in 1999, with a wider release in 2000.

Critical reception
The Quietus wrote that "the noise aspects were shorn away to a sound that was much more beholden to classic acid folk." SF Weekly wrote: "Gorgeously exotic guitar lines, shimmering bells, subtle sound effects, and incantationlike vocals combine to create a work invoking everyone from American folk radicals and British pagan-folksters to early Tyrannosaurus Rex and the Sun City Girls at their quietest."

Track listing
"Stone Finders Verse I" – 1:35
"Assyria" – 3:02
"Hollow Light Severed Sun" – 5:29
"Tukulti Will Burn" – 1:13
"Blue Sun Chiming" – 2:41
"Oak Path" – 3:49
"Black Needle Rhymes" – 5:38
"Sophia" – 3:47
"Journey Through Sankuan Pass" – 10:49
"Stone Finders Verse II" – 1:38
"Dance Among the Waiting" – 7:18

References

2000 albums
Six Organs of Admittance albums
New Weird America albums